The Kepong Sentral Komuter station is a KTM Komuter train station located in Kepong, Petaling District, Selangor, Malaysia. The station is the newest addition to the KTM Komuter system, which opened on 1 July 2006. Situated just beside this station is the Kuala Lumpur Middle Ring Road 2 (MRR2). Starting on 1 December 2008, it became one of the stations of the Sentral KL-Ipoh-Sentral KL intercity route. However, it was ceased in August 2010 and replaced by the KTM ETS services.

The Kepong Sentral Komuter station was built to cater to the traffic in Kepong, a suburban area. The Kepong Komuter station, which also serves the same locality is located 1 km away.

The MRT Putrajaya line will be connected to this station, and is currently under construction. The station will be named Sri Damansara Timur opened in June 2022. The station will serve the suburbs of Bandar Sri Damansara in Selangor and Kepong in Kuala Lumpur.

References

External links

 Kepong Sentral KTM Komuter Station

Petaling District
Port Klang Line
Railway stations in Selangor
Rapid transit stations in Selangor
KTM ETS railway stations